Johan Löfstrand (born 1976), is a Swedish social democratic politician who has been a member of the Riksdag since 2002.

References

1976 births
Living people
Members of the Riksdag from the Social Democrats
Members of the Riksdag 2002–2006
Members of the Riksdag 2006–2010
Members of the Riksdag 2010–2014
Members of the Riksdag 2014–2018
Members of the Riksdag 2018–2022
Members of the Riksdag 2022–2026
21st-century Swedish politicians